Theodor Tolsdorff (3 November 1909 – 25 May 1978) was a general in the Wehrmacht of Nazi Germany during World War II. He was one of 27 recipients of the Knight's Cross of the Iron Cross with Oak Leaves, Swords and Diamonds. He was convicted in 1954 and subsequently acquitted in 1960. The trials generated substantial public interest and media coverage.

Early life

Tolsdorf was born on 3 November 1909, in the family estate in Lehnarten in the Province of East Prussia, a state of the German Empire (today's Poland). He was the youngest of four children and only son of Theodor Tolsdorff, an artillery officer. Tolsdorf attended the Gymnasium (advanced secondary school) in Königsberg, present-day Kaliningrad, and following the death of his father in 1919 took over the family estate. On 1 October 1934, Tolsdorf joined the German Army. By 1938, he was an Oberleutnant (first lieutenant); he was given command of an anti-tank company in the 1st Infantry Division on 1 April 1939.

World War II
As commander of a company, Tolsdorff participated in the German invasion of Poland in 1939 and was awarded both classes of the Iron Cross. Tolsdorff participated in the Battle of France in 1940.

Operation Barbarossa, the German invasion of the Soviet Union began on 22 June 1941. In November, Tolsdorff was wounded while leading an attack. He was promoted to Hauptmann (captain) on 1 December 1941 and awarded the Knight's Cross of the Iron Cross on 4 December 1941, while in the hospital. He returned to the front in April 1942 and participated in the heavy fighting for Shlisselburg. Tolsdorff was awarded the Knight's Cross of the Iron Cross with Oak Leaves on 15 September 1943.

In June 1944, Tolsdorff participated in the fighting against the Soviet Vilnius Offensive. He was promoted to Oberst (colonel) and was awarded the Knight's Cross of the Iron Cross with Oak Leaves and Swords on 18 July 1944. Afterwards, he was appointed commander of the newly formed 340th Volksgrenadier Division. In mid-November, the unit transferred to the Aachen-Jülich area on the west to defend against US forces trying to cross the Rhine. In December, the unit was withdrawn to make preparations for the Ardennes offensive. The division fought as part of the 5th Panzer Army under command of Hasso von Manteuffel. On 18 March 1945, Tolsdorff received in Berlin the Knight's Cross of the Iron Cross with Oak Leaves, Swords and Diamonds. He was promoted to Generalleutnant (major general) and appointed commander of the LXXXII Army Corps, which was stationed in Bavaria.

On 8 May, he surrendered in Austria to Lt. Carwood Lipton and Robert F. Sink of the 101st Airborne Division. Tolsdorff's convoy of 31 vehicles drove down from the mountains loaded with his personal baggage, liquor, cigars, cigarettes and his girlfriends. Private Edward Heffron took Tolsdorff's Luger pistol and a briefcase containing Iron Cross medals and a stash of pornographic pictures.

Criminal charges, trials, conviction, and acquittal

Tolsdorff was married to Eleonore, née van der Berk (6 September 1921 – 15 April 1996). The marriage produced two sons. His youngest son Jürgen died in 1957, in an accident. His older son, Peter, became a doctor and settled in Bad Honnef.

On 9 May 1947, Tolsdorff was released from American captivity. He took various jobs, such as truck driver in the firm belonging to his father-in-law, bus driver on the route Diepholz to Hanover and construction worker. He was arrested on 7 December 1952.

In 1954, he faced charges for the execution of Franz Xaver Holzhey, an army captain and First World War veteran, on 3 May 1945. Holzhey, without orders, had put up a red cross sign near the command post. The Landgericht (court) in Traunstein had initially sentenced Tolsdorff to three and a half years. The Federal Court of Justice of Germany overturned the decision in 1959 and ordered a retrial. On 24 June 1960, Tolsdorff was declared not guilty and cleared of all charges.

The same year, Tolsdorff was hired by Deutsche Asphalt GmbH, presently owned by Strabag Group, and held a position of manager until 1969, when he took over the branch office in Dortmund. Tolsdorff retired on 31 December 1974. Following a serious accident, he died on 25 May 1978 in Dortmund.

Summary of career

Awards
 Iron Cross (1939)
 2nd Class (22 September 1939)
 1st Class (23 October 1939)
 German Cross in Gold on 23 August 1942 as Hauptmann in the I./Infanterie-Regiment 22
 Knight's Cross of the Iron Cross with Oak Leaves, Swords and Diamonds
 Knight's Cross on 4 December 1941 as Oberleutnant and chief of the 14./Infanterie-Regiment 22
 302nd Oak Leaves on 15 September 1943 as Major and commander of the I./Füsilier-Regiment 22
 80th Swords on 18 July 1944 as Oberstleutnant and commander of Grenadier-Regiment 1067 and leader of the Kampfgruppe Tolsdorff
 25th Diamonds on 18 March 1945 as Generalmajor and commander of the 340. Volksgrenadier-Division

Promotions

References

Citations

Bibliography

 
 
 
 
 
 
 
 
 
 

1909 births
1978 deaths
People from East Prussia
Recipients of the Gold German Cross
Recipients of the Knight's Cross of the Iron Cross with Oak Leaves, Swords and Diamonds
Lieutenant generals of the German Army (Wehrmacht)
German prisoners of war in World War II held by the United States